The 16th legislature of the French Fifth Republic was elected in the 2022 French legislative election. It was preceded by the 15th legislature.

Composition of the executive 

 President of France: Emmanuel Macron (LREM), since 14 May 2017

Membership 

For the first time since the 1988 legislative election, the incumbent President of France failed to earn a parliamentary majority in the National Assembly. The 2022 legislative election was widely seen as a severe blow for Emmanuel Macron. Both the outgoing President of the National Assembly Richard Ferrand and leader of the La République En Marche! party in the National Assembly Christophe Castaner lost their seats. The position of Élisabeth Borne as Prime Minister was put into question following the election result. On 21 June 2022, she offered her resignation to President Macron, who refused to accept it.

On 28 June 2022, Yaël Braun-Pivet was elected to succeed Ferrand as President of the National Assembly.

Changes

See also 
 Candidates in the 2022 French legislative election
 Election results of Cabinet Ministers during the 2022 French legislative election
 List of MPs who lost their seat in the 2022 French legislative election
 Results of the 2022 French legislative election by constituency

References 

2022 French legislative election
National Assembly (France)
2020s in French politics